Glushitsy is a rural locality (a village) in Rybinsky District of Yaroslavl Oblast, Russia. Population: 2.

References

Rural localities in Yaroslavl Oblast